Tup Chenar (also Romanized as Tūp Chenār and Top Chenār; also known as Tū Chenār) is a village in Atrak Rural District, Maneh District, Maneh and Samalqan County, North Khorasan Province, Iran. At the 2006 census, its population was 401, in 96 families.

References 

Populated places in Maneh and Samalqan County